Durley Chine is a Blue Flag beach and chine in Bournemouth, Dorset in England. It is to the west of Bournemouth Town Centre, north of West Cliff, and east of Westbourne.

Landscape 
On clear days views of the Isle of Wight and Old Harry Rocks can be seen.

Facilities 
Along the beach there are beach huts and a Harvester, known as the Durley Inn.

Politics 
Durley Chine is part of the Bournemouth West parliamentary constituency.

References 

Areas of Bournemouth